"I Love It" is the third single by Australian dance group Sneaky Sound System, taken from their self-titled debut album Sneaky Sound System (2006). The song was their first charting single, as it peaked at #24 on the ARIA Singles Chart on 7 January 2007. It also scored their first two ARIA nominations for "Best Dance Release" and "Breakthrough Artist - Single". On 4 December 2007, "I Love It" spent its 70th week in the Top 100 Singles Chart, breaking the record for the most number of weeks in the ARIA Top 100 for a single, previously held by The Living End's Second Solution / Prisoner of Society, which spent 69 weeks in the ARIA Top 100.

On 2 March 2009 it was released as the third single in the UK, taken from their self-titled UK compilation album Sneaky Sound System (2009).

Track listing

Music video
The video starts with clips of the male band members playing air instruments. Connie and 4 dancing girls appear dressed in yellow, juxtaposed with footage of Connie dressed in turquoise.

UK version 
The video starts with hands grabbing items off a table, with the band's name followed by the song title appearing as watermarks in the middle of the screen. Connie is then shown sitting at the table singing the song with girls posing around her. The girls then start to tear a seated man's clothes off, before footage is shown of them dancing around the table. Connie is then shown holding the chains to two restrained male bodybuilders. Footage of posing bodybuilders is later intercut with footage of the dancing girls and Connie. The male members in Sneaky Sound System appear in the video however Connie features much more predominantly.

Personnel 
 Black Angus – bass, drums, guitars, keys, producer
 Peter Dolso – bass, drums, engineer, guitars, keys, mixed by, producer
 Jack Glass – additional production (track 2)
 Michael K – cover
 A. McDonald – writer
 Connie Mitchell – vocals
 Riot in Belgium – additional production (track 3), remix (track 3)
 Chris Stracey – additional production (track 2)
 Van She Tech – additional production (track 3), remix (track 3)

Charts

Weekly charts

Year-end charts

Release history

References

External links
 Australian CD single on Waterfront Records

Sneaky Sound System songs
2006 singles
2006 songs
2009 singles
14th Floor Records singles